Min Hla (also known as Min Hla Nge, မင်းလှငယ် , ; 1417–1425) was king of Ava for three months in 1425. The eldest child of King Thihathu of Ava (r. 1421–1425) was only 8 when he was placed on the throne by the court, following the assassination of his father. The boy king too was assassinated three months later by Queen Shin Bo-Me, who had arranged his father's assassination. He was succeeded by Prince Nyo of Kale Kye-Taung, Bo-Me's lover.

Brief
Min Hla was born to Princess Saw Min Hla and Crown Prince Thihathu in Ava (Inwa),  26 April 1417. The prince had two younger sisters, Saw Pyei Chantha and Shwe Pyi Shin Me, and four older maternal half-siblings—Minye Kyawhtin, Min Hla Htut, Minye Aung Naing, Saw Min Phyu, from his mother's first marriage to his uncle Crown Prince Minye Kyawswa. His mother was wedded to his father in 1416, a year after the death of Minye Kyawswa, by his grandfather King Minkhaung I (r. 1400–1421).

Minkhaung died in 1421, and with Thihathu's accession, a 4-year-old Min Hla became the heir-presumptive of the kingdom. About four years later in August 1425, Thihathu was assassinated in an attempted coup by one of his queens, Shin Bo-Me, who had planned to place her lover Prince Nyo of Kale (Kalay) on the throne. But the coup was not an immediate success. The court simply followed the order of succession, and chose Min Hla as the next king.

Not everyone was pleased. Queen Bo-Me openly questioned the court's selection of an 8-year-old boy when Prince Nyo, an accomplished military commander and senior prince with a legitimate claim to the throne—he was the eldest son of King Tarabya of Ava (r. 1400)—was available. She invited Prince of Kale to come down to Ava to claim the throne by force. Nyo marched to Ava with an army right after the rainy season was over. At Ava, Bo-Me managed to poison the boy king to death in early November 1425. The Bo-Me faction successfully placed Nyo on the throne.

Historiography
The following is a list of the key events as reported in the royal chronicles.

Ancestry

Notes

References

Bibliography
 
 
 
 
 

Ava dynasty
1417 births
1425 deaths
Assassinated Burmese people
People executed by poison
15th-century Burmese monarchs